A Breed Apart is the soundtrack album for the film A Breed Apart, composed and performed by Maurice Gibb. All of the instrumentals were recorded in 1984 but "Hold Her in Your Hand" and "On Time" were recorded in 1983. This soundtrack was the last recording session at the famous Gold Star Studios in Los Angeles. Even though he did not play on the soundtrack, Jimmie Haskell said years later that he was very impressed by Maurice's demos, especially his sensitive playing of the flute parts.  Jimmie mixed the synthesizer flute into the finished recordings because he liked the sound. "Hold Her in Your Hand" was released as a single in 1984.

Track listing
All the songs written and composed by Maurice Gibb except for “Hold Her in Your Hand”, which is by Maurice and Barry Gibb.

Personnel
 Jimmie Haskell — orchestral arrangement
 Maurice Gibb — synthesizer, lead vocal on "Hold Her in Your Hand" and "On Time"
 Dennis Hetzendorfer — engineer

References

1984 soundtrack albums
Maurice Gibb albums
Albums produced by Maurice Gibb
Albums arranged by Jimmie Haskell
Instrumental albums
Unreleased albums
Drama film soundtracks